Tales of Space and Time is a fantasy and science fiction collection of three short stories and two novellas written by the English author H. G. Wells between 1897 and 1898. It was first published by Doubleday & McClure Co. in 1899. All the stories had first been published in various monthly periodicals and this was the first volume to collect these stories.

Contents
These are the stories contained in this collection showing the periodicals in which they were first published.
"The Crystal Egg" (short story, The New Review, May 1897)
"The Star" (short story, The Graphic, December 1897)
"A Story of the Stone Age" (novella, The Idler, May–September 1897) comprising:
"Ugh-Lomi and Uya"
"The Cave Bear"
"The First Horseman"
"Uya the Lion"
"The Fight in the Lion’s Thicket"
"A Story of the Days to Come" (novella, The Pall Mall Magazine, June–October 1899) comprising:
"The Cure for Love"
"The Vacant Country"
"The Ways of the City"
"Underneath"
"Bindon Intervenes"
"The Man Who Could Work Miracles" (short story, Illustrated London News, July 1898)

External links

 
  
 
Tales of Space and Time. Index to Science Fiction Anthologies and Collections.
 

1899 short story collections
Short story collections by H. G. Wells
Doubleday & McClure Company books
Speculative fiction short story collections